Gaetano Maria Travasa (1698 - 1774) was a Theatine priest and ecclesiastical historian and scholar. He was born in Bassano and studied at the college of the Theatines in Venice. Among his published works are:
Vita di Ario
Storia critica delle vite degli eresiarchi del primo secolo della Chiesa, by Gaetano Maria Travasa (1752)
Quaresimale or (Lenten Meditations), by Gaetano Maria Travasa, cherico regolare teatino (1766).

In his discussions of first century heresiarchs, he talks of Simon Magus; Menander; Cerinthus; Ebion the putative founder of Ebionites; and Arius.

References

1698 births
1774 deaths
Theatines
Historians of Christianity